Alexander Rhind (20 September 1849 – 22 January 1922) was a Scottish footballer who played as a forward.

Career
Born in Aberdeen, Rhind played club football for Queen's Park, and he made only one appearance for Scotland in 1872 during the first official international football match. He later served as president of Caledonian.

References

1849 births
1922 deaths
Scottish footballers
Scotland international footballers
Queen's Park F.C. players
Association football forwards
Footballers from Aberdeen